Trina & Tamara is the only studio album by American contemporary R&B group Trina & Tamara, released May 11, 1999 via C2 Records (which was distributed via Columbia Records). Co-produced by the group along with Randy Jackson, it did not chart on the Billboard 200 but peaked at #99 on the Billboard R&B chart.

The album produced the singles "What'd You Come Here For?" and "Joanne". In addition to original songs, the album contains a cover of "Settle for My Love" by Patrice Rushen.

Track listing

Charts

Samples

References

External links
 
 

1999 debut albums
Albums produced by Randy Jackson
Contemporary R&B albums by American artists
Columbia Records albums